On January 15, 2010, the Department of Defense complied with a court order and published a list of Captives held in the Bagram Theater Internment Facility that included the name
Ahmad Dilshad.

There were 645 names on the list, which was dated September 22, 2009, and was heavily redacted.

According to historian Andy Worthington, author of The Guantanamo Files, Ahmad Dilshad was captured in Baghdad, Iraq with four other men.
Worthington reported Ahmad Dilshad was also known as "Danish Ahmad" and "Abdul Rehman al-Dakhil".

Asia Times called him a "leading LeT [Lashkar-e-Tayyiba] ringleader"—a militant group devoted to an independence for the portion of Kashmir occupied by India.
Asia Times reported that Dilshad had called for LeT to expand its militant activities beyond Kashmir as early as 1997.
They reported he was a "known confidant of Zaki-ur-Rahman Lakhvi".
They reported he had served as LeT's operational head, and had "trained many LeT fighters in its Maskar Abu Bashir camp in Afghanistan".

Worthington reports he was captured in Baghdad.  Asia Times reports he was captured in Iraq's southernmost city, Basra, on its border with Iran.

References

Bagram Theater Internment Facility detainees
Living people
Year of birth missing (living people)